Shayne Jackson is a Canadian professional lacrosse player playing for the Georgia Swarm of the National Lacrosse League (NLL) and Cannons LC of the Premier Lacrosse League (PLL). He previously played for the Charlotte Hounds, Atlanta Blaze & Philadelphia Barrage in the Major League Lacrosse (MLL).

Drafted fourth overall in 2012 NLL Entry Draft by the Minnesota Swarm, he has played his entire NLL career with the Swarm franchise. He was named the National Lacrosse League MVP Award winner of the pandemic shortened 2020 NLL season.

For college, Jackson started out playing for Onondaga Community College. With them, he won two NJCAA national titles and was the 2010 NJCAA player of the year. He followed that with two years at Limestone College.

Statistics

NLL

MLL

PLL

Awards and achievements

References 

1990 births
Living people
Atlanta Blaze players
Canadian lacrosse players
Charlotte Hounds players
Georgia Swarm players
Lacrosse forwards
Lacrosse people from Ontario
Limestone Saints athletes
Minnesota Swarm players
National Lacrosse League major award winners
Onondaga Lazers athletes
Philadelphia Barrage players
Premier Lacrosse League players

External links 
Professional statistics via statscrew.com

Premier Lacrosse League bio